Eucorethrina is a genus of flies belonging to the family Chaoboridae.

The species of this genus are found in Europe and Russia.

Species:
 Eucorethrina convexa Lukashevich, 1996 
 Eucorethrina flexa Kalugina, 1985

References

Chaoboridae